Spinetoram (marketed as Cheristin in its topical veterinary dosage-form) is an insecticidal mixture of two active neurotoxic constituents of Saccharopolyspora spinosa. It is used to control pest insects in stored grain and on domestic cats.

See also 
Spinosad

References 

Insecticides